Paraxenisthmus springeri is a species of fish in the genus Paraxenisthmus of the Xenisthmidae (wriggler) family, which is regarded as a synonymous with the Eleotridae, from the West Pacific. Its specific name honours the American ichthyologist Victor G. Springer (b. 1928) of the U.S. National Museum for his contributions to fish systematics.

References

Xenisthmidae
Eleotridae
Fish described in 1993